Bed of Roses (1933) is a pre-Code romantic comedy film co-written and directed by Gregory La Cava and starring Constance Bennett. The picture was released by RKO Radio Pictures with a supporting cast featuring Joel McCrea and Pert Kelton.

The film is preserved in the Library of Congress collection.

Plot
Lorry (Constance Bennett) and Minnie (Pert Kelton) are a pair of rollickingly wanton prostitutes who occasionally get hapless male admirers drunk before robbing them. After being released from a Louisiana jail they head down the Mississippi River on a steamboat. Lorry steals $60 from a "Mr. Smith" she entertains in her room, and when she is confronted by the boat's captain, who accuses her of the theft, she escapes by jumping off the vessel into the river. She loses the $60 as she is rescued by cotton barge skipper Dan (Joel McCrea), so she robs him too.

Once in New Orleans, Lorry disguises herself as a newspaper writer in order to meet publishing magnate Stephen Paige (John Halliday) that she took notice of on the steamboat. She then gets him drunk, takes him to his home, and the next morning blackmails him into supporting her, including renting a lavish apartment for her. She returns to the cotton barge and repays Dan his "loan" and they fall in love. Minnie now arrives at Lorry's apartment, soon followed by Stephen, who threatens to expose her sordid past, causing her to leave him but not to return to Dan, whom she had agreed to marry. When Stephen cannot persuade her to return to him, he realizes that she really does love Dan, and he brings about their reunion with the help of the now-married Minnie.

Cast

Reception
The film in 1933 received generally mediocre reviews in leading newspapers and trade papers. The one consistent exception in the print media's rather lukewarm reaction to the production was Pert Kelton, whose performance was widely praised. In his review for The New York Times, critic Mordaunt Hall views the "callous creature" portrayed by Constance Bennett as initially "disconcerting", and he finds parts of the story unbelievable, noting that its "characters do not always behave as if they were drawn from life." Hall, however, does recognize Kelton for doing "remarkably well as the slangy Minnie".

The Film Daily in its July 1, 1933 issue judges Bed of Roses as "average entertainment" and describes Bennett as moving "through her part without any distinction." On the other hand, Kelton's performance also impressed the trade paper. "She fits the hard-boiled part perfectly", The Film Daily observes, "and scores repeatedly with hearty laughs." Abel Green in his review for Variety, another widely read entertainment paper at the time, refers to the "so-so flicker" as "tawdry and unwholesome in the main". He too preferred to focus on Kelton:

References and notes

External links
 
 
 
 

1933 films
1933 romantic comedy films
American black-and-white films
American romantic comedy films
Films about prostitution in the United States
Films directed by Gregory La Cava
Films set in New Orleans
Films set in Louisiana
Films with screenplays by Wanda Tuchock
RKO Pictures films
1930s English-language films
1930s American films